The Quebec Nordiques (pronounced  in Quebec French,  in Canadian English; translated "Northmen" or "Northerners") were a professional ice hockey team based in Quebec City. The Nordiques played in the World Hockey Association (1972–1979) and the National Hockey League (1979–1995). The franchise was relocated to Denver, Colorado in May 1995 and renamed the Colorado Avalanche. They played their home games at the Colisée de Québec from 1972 to 1995.

The Nordiques were the only major professional sports team based in Quebec City in the modern era, and one of two ever; the other, the Quebec Bulldogs, played in the National Hockey Association (NHA) from 1910 to 1917 and one season in the NHL in 1919–20.

History

Beginnings in the WHA

The Quebec Nordiques formed as one of the original World Hockey Association teams in 1972. The franchise was originally awarded to a group in San Francisco and named the San Francisco Sharks. However, the San Francisco group's funding collapsed prior to the start of the first season.  Rather than play an unbalanced schedule with 11 teams, the WHA hastily awarded the Sharks' assets the organization to a consortium of Quebec City-based businessmen who owned the highly-profitable Quebec Remparts junior team. They bought the team after the American Hockey League team, the Quebec Aces, moved south to Richmond, Virginia.

The team was renamed the Quebec Nordiques because they were one of the northernmost teams in professional sports in North America. Quebec City is located at 46 degrees north latitude; Nordiques translated from French to English means "Northerners" or "Northmen." The only WHA teams located farther north were the Alberta Oilers (who changed their name to the Edmonton Oilers after one season), Calgary Cowboys, Vancouver Blazers, and Winnipeg Jets.

The Nordiques' first head coach was the legendary Maurice "Rocket" Richard but he only lasted two games – a 2–0 loss to the Cleveland Crusaders and a 6–0 win against the Alberta Oilers. Richard decided coaching was not his forte and stepped down.

The Nordiques' first star was two-way defenceman J. C. Tremblay, who led the WHA in assists in the league's first season and would be named a league All-Star for his first four years in Quebec. The next season Serge Bernier and Rejean Houle joined the Nordiques. In 1974–75 season, they finally made the playoffs with the help of the high-scoring Marc Tardif; the year also saw the debut of Real Cloutier, who would be one of the WHA's stars. They beat the Phoenix Roadrunners and the Minnesota Fighting Saints to reach the finals, where they were swept in four games by the Gordie Howe-led Houston Aeros.

The next season saw the squad become a high-flying offensive juggernaut, becoming the only team in major professional history to have five players break 100 points (Tardif, Cloutier, Chris Bordeleau, Bernier and Houle), a mark which still stands as of 2022. The season ended in disappointment as the Nordiques lost to the Calgary Cowboys in the first round of the playoffs, after losing Marc Tardif to injury after a controversial hit by the Cowboys' Rick Jodzio.

Despite injuries to Tardif and an aging Tremblay, the Nordiques finally captured the Avco World Trophy in 1976–77 as they took out the New England Whalers and the Indianapolis Racers in five games before beating the Winnipeg Jets in seven, behind Bernier's record 36 points in 17 playoff games. They represented Canada at the Izvestia Hockey Tournament in Moscow, finishing last with an 0–3–1 record.

By 1978, the WHA was in crisis, and Marcel Aubut, by then the team's president under ownership of the Carling-O'Keefe Brewery, began checking on interest in the NHL. The Nordiques were unable to defend their title and fell in the playoffs to the New England Whalers. The 1978–79 season would be the final one for the WHA and for J. C. Tremblay, who retired at the end of the season and had his #3 jersey retired.

1980s
As part of the NHL–WHA merger, the WHA insisted on including all of its surviving Canadian teams, including the Nordiques, among the teams taken into the NHL at the end of the 1978–79 season. As a result, the Nordiques entered the NHL along with the Whalers, Oilers, and Jets. The Nordiques would be placed in the Adams Division of the Wales Conference.

Forced to let all but three players go in a dispersal draft, the Nordiques sank to the bottom of the standings. They finished the 1979–80 NHL season with the second-worst record in the league despite the play of promising rookie left winger Michel Goulet. An early highlight to the otherwise dreary season came when Real Cloutier became the second NHL player, following Alex Smart, ever to score a hat trick in his first NHL game.

In August 1980 the Nordiques announced that they signed newly defected brothers Peter and Anton Stastny, members of the Czechoslovak national team, since they drafted Anton in the 1979 amateur draft. Their brother, Marian, would follow and also sign with Quebec in the summer of 1981. The following season, led by Peter Stastny's 109-point Calder Memorial Trophy-winning performance, the Nordiques made the NHL playoffs for the first time, but fell in the best-of-five opening round in five games to the Philadelphia Flyers.

Led by Goulet and Peter Stastny, the Nordiques made the playoffs seven years in a row. However, due to the playoff structure during most of the 1980s, the Nordiques faced the near-certainty of having to get past either the Montreal Canadiens or Boston Bruins–or both–to make it to the conference finals. In 1981–82, despite notching only 82 points in the regular season, they defeated the Canadiens and Bruins, both in winner-take-all games on the road. Their Cinderella run ended when they were swept by the defending champion New York Islanders in the conference finals.

The intraprovincial rivalry with the Canadiens intensified during the 1983–84 NHL season culminating in the infamous Good Friday Massacre–or "Vendredi Saint," as it is called in francophone Canada–during the 1984 playoffs. The Canadiens scored five unanswered goals in the third period of Game 6 at the Montreal Forum to eliminate the Nordiques. The goals all came after Peter Stastny and Dale Hunter were ejected in the brawl.

In 1984–85, Montreal and Quebec battled for the Adams Division championship. The Nordiques finished with 91 points, at the time their highest point total as an NHL team. However, the Canadiens won the division by three points—solidified by a 7–1 Canadiens thrashing of the Nordiques at The Forum in the final week of the regular season. This was still enough, however, for the Nordiques to garner home-ice advantage for the first time ever as an NHL team. After being pushed to five games by the Buffalo Sabres, they would exact revenge on the Canadiens in the Adams finals by ousting them in seven games. Peter Stastny clinched the series with an overtime goal in the seventh game at the Forum. They then took the powerful Philadelphia Flyers, who had the league's best record, to six games.

They won their first NHL division title in 1985–86 (and as it turned out, one of their two in Quebec, the other in the 1994–95 season), but a defensive collapse in the playoffs allowed the Hartford Whalers to sweep the Nordiques in three games.

The next season the Nordiques met the Whalers in the playoffs for the second straight season, this time the Nords would get their revenge beating Hartford in six games. The next round saw more of the Nordiques–Canadiens rivalry as the playoff series went to seven games, with the Canadiens coming out on top, after that the Nords would not return to the playoffs again until 1993. In that same season, when Quebec hosted Rendez-Vous '87, an alteration of the All-Star Game to include the Soviet national team, a costumed mascot, Badaboum—a fuzzy, roly-poly blue creature—began entertaining fans at the Colisée with his bizarre dance routines. Badaboum was created just for Rendez-Vous, but generated such a following that the Nordiques made him a permanent fixture at home games.

Decline began the following season. The Nordiques finished last in their division – the first of five straight years of finishing at the bottom of the Adams Division – and missed the playoffs for the first time in eight years. The slide continued: in 1988–89 they had the league's worst record.

Michel Bergeron, who had coached the team from 1980 to 1987, returned for 1989–90. The season was also highlighted by the arrival of Hall of Famer Guy Lafleur, who turned down a lucrative offer from the Los Angeles Kings and chose instead to finish his career in his home province. It soon became clear Lafleur's best years were far behind him. "The Flower" managed only 24 goals in 98 games with Quebec over two seasons. The season saw the Nordiques bottom out with a record of 12–61–7 (31 points)—easily the worst record in the league, and not even half the point total of the next-worst team, the Vancouver Canucks. It is still the worst record in Nordiques/Avalanche history (both NHL and WHA), and one of the worst for a non-expansion team since 1967. It was also the second of three straight seasons with the worst record in the league.

Michel Goulet and Peter Stastny were traded in 1990, winding up with the Chicago Blackhawks and New Jersey Devils respectively. Despite the stellar play of young forward Joe Sakic, the Nordiques struggled throughout the late 1980s and early 1990s. However, in the 1989 NHL Entry Draft they drafted Swedish prospect Mats Sundin, making him the first European to be selected first overall in the NHL draft. The following year Quebec chose first again, taking Owen Nolan.

1990s

Lindros draft and trade

In 1991, the Nordiques once again had the first overall pick in the NHL Entry Draft. They picked junior star Eric Lindros, even though he had let it be known well in advance that he would never play for Quebec. Among the reasons, Lindros cited distance, lack of marketing potential, and having to speak French. After the Nordiques selected him anyway, Lindros then refused to wear the team jersey on Draft Day and only held it for press photographs. Lindros, on advice of his mother Bonnie, refused to sign with the team and began a holdout that lasted over a year. The Nordiques president publicly announced that they would make Lindros the centrepiece of their franchise turnaround, and refused to trade Lindros, saying that he would not have a career in the NHL as long as he held out. Some of the Nordiques wanted to move on without Lindros, as Joe Sakic commented "We only want players here who have the passion to play the game. I'm tired of hearing that name. He's not here and there are a lot of others in this locker room who really care about the game." Meanwhile, the Nordiques finished with another dreadful season in 1991–92, missing the 70-point barrier for the fifth year in a row. For the first time since 1988, the Nordiques did not finish with the NHL's worst record, as they finished ahead of the expansion San Jose Sharks in the overall standings.

On June 30, 1992, after confusion over whether Quebec had traded Lindros' rights to the Philadelphia Flyers or New York Rangers was settled by an arbitrator, the Nordiques sent Lindros to the Flyers in exchange for forwards Peter Forsberg and Mike Ricci, goaltender Ron Hextall, defencemen Steve Duchesne and Kerry Huffman, "future considerations" which eventually became enforcer Chris Simon, two first-round picks and US$15 million. One of the draft picks was used by the Nordiques to select goaltender Jocelyn Thibault, the other was traded twice and ultimately used by the Washington Capitals to select Nolan Baumgartner.

After the trade, Lindros said that his refusal to play for the Nordiques had nothing to do with the language question, and more to do with what he saw as a "lack of winning spirit" in the Nordiques organization. However, in 2016, Lindros said that he simply did not want to play for a team owned by Aubut.

The deal transformed the Nordiques from league doormats to a legitimate Stanley Cup contender almost overnight. Forsberg won the Calder Memorial Trophy in 1995, his first season with the Nordiques, and would be one of the cornerstones of the Nordiques/Avalanche franchise for almost a decade with his playmaking and physical presence (albeit being out with injury for periods of time like Lindros), winning the Hart and Art Ross trophies in 2003. Ricci would give six useful seasons to the franchise before being traded. Hextall was moved after a single season to the New York Islanders, and in return the Nordiques got Mark Fitzpatrick (who would go on to be left unprotected in the 1993 NHL Expansion Draft in which he was claimed by the Florida Panthers) and a first round pick, which the Nordiques used to select Adam Deadmarsh, who would be a key member of the Avalanche Cup-winning teams. Thibault would be traded for Montreal goalie Patrick Roy, after the franchise moved to Denver.

1992–1994
During the 1992–93 NHL season, these new players, along with Sakic – now a bona fide NHL All-Star – and the rapidly developing Sundin and Nolan, led Quebec to the biggest single-season turnaround in NHL history. They leaped from 52 points in the previous season to 104—in the process, going from the second-worst record in the league to the fourth-best (behind only Pittsburgh, Boston and Chicago), as well as notching the franchise's first 100-point season as an NHL team. They made the playoffs for the first time in six seasons, and also garnered home-ice advantage in the first round for only the third time ever as an NHL team. However, they fell to the eventual Stanley Cup champion Canadiens in the first round, winning the first two games but then losing the next four due to inspired goaltending from Montreal's Patrick Roy. Sakic and Sundin both scored over 100 points each, and head coach Pierre Pagé was a finalist for the Jack Adams Award.

In 1993, the NHL renamed their conferences and divisions to better reflect geography; the Nordiques would be situated in the Northeast Division of the Eastern Conference for their last two seasons of play in Quebec. The Nordiques missed the playoffs in 1993–94 as they struggled with injuries. After that season, Sundin was traded to the Toronto Maple Leafs in return for Wendel Clark. This trade was controversial for both teams, as Sundin was one of the Nordiques' rising talents, while Clark was the Leafs captain and fan favourite. While Clark performed respectably, he then became embroiled in a contract dispute after the season ended and was sent to the New York Islanders.

Final season and move to Denver
For the 1994–95 season, Marc Crawford was hired as the new head coach, and Forsberg was deemed ready to finally join the team, but first there was the problem of a lockout. In the shortened season of 48 games, the Nordiques finished with the best record in the Eastern Conference. However, the team faltered in the postseason and was eliminated in the first round by the defending Stanley Cup champion New York Rangers in six games.

The playoff loss proved to be the Nordiques' swan song as the team's financial troubles increasingly took centre stage, even in the face of renewed fan support over the previous three years. The league's Canadian teams found it difficult to compete in a new age of rising player salaries and a weakening Canadian dollar. Quebec City was by far the smallest market in the NHL; it was also the second-smallest major-league city in North America, behind only Green Bay, Wisconsin; home of the National Football League's Green Bay Packers. However, the Packers had long drawn support from the nearby major market of Milwaukee, a luxury the Nordiques did not have.

The Nordiques also faced a unique disadvantage due to Quebec City's status as a virtually monolingual francophone city. There were no privately-owned anglophone radio stations and only one privately-owned anglophone television station. The only anglophone newspaper was a weekly. The near-total lack of English-language media limited the Nordiques' marketability even in their best years, and made many non-French-speaking players wary of playing for them. 

While Aubut never lost money on the Nordiques, he feared unsustainable losses without a bailout from Quebec's provincial government. However, Premier Jacques Parizeau turned the request down, as few in Quebec were willing to be seen as subsidizing a hockey club that paid multimillion-dollar salaries. Finally in May 1995, shortly after the Nordiques were eliminated from the playoffs, Aubut announced the acceptance an offer from COMSAT Entertainment Group, owner of the National Basketball Association's Denver Nuggets to move the team to Denver, where it was renamed the Colorado Avalanche. 

Maintaining their momentum from their successful last season as the Nordiques, the Avalanche won the Stanley Cup in their first season after the move, added another in 2001, and recently in 2022. They would also win their division every year in their first eight years in Denver for a total of nine consecutive division titles, the second-most in the expansion era.

The last active NHL player who played for the Nordiques was Adam Foote who announced his retirement after the 2010–11 season. The last active player in any league was Martin Rucinsky, who announced his retirement after the 2014–15 season while playing in the Czech Extraliga.

Uniforms
Throughout their history, the Nordiques were famous for their iconic powder blue and white uniforms. But for their first WHA season, the Nordiques' uniforms featured splashes of red on the shoulders, waist and numbers. From 1973 to 1975, the blue on the Nordiques uniforms briefly reverted to a dark royal blue shade. Contrasting nameplates were used in 1973–74, then the fleur-de-lis symbol was added to the shoulders the following season which was modeled after the flag of Quebec.

Prior to the 1975–76 season, the Nordiques unveiled what was now their standard look, returning to a powder blue base and adding three fleur-de-lis symbols on the waist. Red was only used on the logo. For the first season, the Nordiques wore red pants, but switched to powder blue pants afterwards. This look would be carried over upon joining the NHL in 1979, and other than some minor trim changes on the logo and numbers, remained basically the same until the relocation.

The Colorado Avalanche unveiled the "Reverse Retro" design based on the Nordiques uniforms on November 16, 2020, honoring the legacy of the franchise.

Uniform change
Aubut intended to change the team's entire look had he won enough financing to keep the Nordiques in Quebec for the 1995–96 season. The Nordiques would have abandoned the blue, white, and red palette they had worn throughout their history in favour of a teal, black, and navy scheme. The team would also have abandoned the "igloo holding a hockey stick" logo they had used for their entire existence in favour of a fierce looking Siberian husky, with "NORDIQUES" in grey block letters below it and the "I" in the team's name fashioned to look like an icicle. These designs were published in local papers before the team ultimately decided to move. Due to the team missing an NHL deadline, the logo and uniforms would not have taken effect until the 1996–97 season.

Season-by-season record

Notable players

Team captains
Includes WHA captains

 Jean-Guy Gendron, 1972–1974
 Michel Parizeau, 1974–1976
 Marc Tardif, 1976–1981
 Robbie Ftorek, 1981
 Andre Dupont, 1981–1982
 Mario Marois, 1983–1985

 Peter Stastny, 1985–1990
 Steven Finn and Joe Sakic 1990–1991 (co-captains)
 Mike Hough 1991–1992
 Joe Sakic 1992–1995

Hall of Famers
Peter Forsberg, C, 1995, inducted in 2014
Michel Goulet, LW, 1979–1990, inducted in 1998
Guy Lafleur, RW, 1989–1991, inducted in 1988
Joe Sakic, C, 1988–1995, inducted in 2012
Peter Stastny, C, 1980–1990, inducted in 1998
Mats Sundin, C, 1990–1994, inducted in 2012

Retired numbers

After the move to Denver, the Avalanche returned all four of these numbers to circulation.

First round draft picks
Note: This list does not include selections from the WHA.
 1979: Michel Goulet (20th overall)
 1980: none
 1981: Randy Moller (11th overall)
 1982: David Shaw (13th overall)
 1983: none
 1984: Trevor Stienburg (15th overall)
 1985: David Latta (15th overall)
 1986: Ken McRae (18th overall)
 1987: Bryan Fogarty (ninth overall) and Joe Sakic (15th overall)
 1988: Curtis Leschyshyn (third overall) and Daniel Dore (fifth overall)
 1989: Mats Sundin (first overall)
 1990: Owen Nolan (first overall)
 1991: Eric Lindros (first overall)
 1992: Todd Warriner (fourth overall)
 1993: Jocelyn Thibault (10th overall) and Adam Deadmarsh (14th overall)
 1994: Wade Belak (12th overall) and Jeff Kealty (22nd overall)

Franchise scoring leaders

These are the top-ten point-scorers in Quebec Nordiques history, combining NHL and WHA totals.

''Legend: Pos = Position; GP = Games played; G = Goals; A = Assists; Pts = Points; P/G = Points per game

Broadcasters

Radio

Television 

The Nordiques games were televised locally by CFAP 2 from 1988 to 1994.

See also
 Potential National Hockey League expansion, possible for Quebec City
 Centre Vidéotron, the replacement facility for the Colisée Pepsi (1949–2015)

References

External links

 Quebec Nordiques on FunWhileItLasted.net
 Quebec Nordiques Preservation Society
 CBC Archives CBC Television on the dying days of the team from 1995.
 Just Another Job, a National Film Board of Canada documentary on the Nordique's first home game

 
Defunct National Hockey League teams
National Hockey League in Quebec
National Hockey League teams based in Canada
Ice hockey clubs established in 1972
Sports clubs disestablished in 1995
History of Colorado Avalanche
1972 establishments in Quebec
1995 disestablishments in Quebec